Kefentse Seshego Mahlo (born ) is a South African rugby union player for the  in the Rugby Challenge. His regular playing positions are winger, fullback or scrum-half.

Career

Youth / Varsity Cup rugby

He played in the semi-final of the competition, which saw the Blue Bulls win 46–35 against the Sharks, but did not play in the final due to injury.

At the end of the season, Mahlo was invited to join a South African Under-20 training camp in preparation for the 2013 IRB Junior World Championship in France, but missed out on final selection.

He also broke into the  set-up, making ten appearances during the 2013 Under-21 Provincial Championship.

Mahlo represented ' first team in the 2014 Varsity Cup competition, playing in all seven of their matches as they finished in fifth spot to miss out on a semi-final spot. After making his first class debut during the 2014 Vodacom Cup, he returned to the  side for the 2014 Under-21 Provincial Championship. He also scored one try in each of their matches against the s to help them reach the final of the competition. He played the full 80 minutes of the final, with the Blue Bulls beating  20–10 to avenge the 2013 final defeat.

Blue Bulls

Mahlo returned to the Vodacom Cup side for their 2015 campaign. Mahlo ended the season with six tries to his name, the top try scorer for the Blue Bulls, and he received the Vodacom Cup Players' Player of the Year award at the Blue Bulls' end-of-years awards ceremony in December 2015.

References

South African rugby union players
Living people
1993 births
People from Tzaneen
Rugby union scrum-halves
Rugby union wings
Rugby union fullbacks
Blue Bulls players
Sportspeople from Limpopo
Bulls (rugby union) players
CSM Știința Baia Mare players
Rugby union players from Limpopo